Minister for Ecclesiastical Affairs of Denmark (lit. Minister for the Church) is a Danish political minister office. The main responsibility of the minister is the Church of Denmark. The minister is politically appointed without any requirements being a member of the state church.

The office was created in 1916 when the post Kultus Minister was split up into the posts of Education Minister and Minister for Ecclesiastical Affairs. The new Minister for Ecclesiastical Affairs also took over the responsibility for culture from the Kultus Minister. In 1961 responsibility for culture was transferred to the Minister for Cultural Affairs.

Since 15 December 2022, Louise Schack Elholm from Venstre, holds the post in the Second Frederiksen Cabinet.

See also
 List of Ministers for Ecclesiastical Affairs of Denmark

References

List of Church Ministers - From the Ministry of Ecclesiastical Affairs.
Danske Regeringsledere - Danish cabinets from 1848 to today.
Danish Governments - From Folketinget.

External links
The Danish Church Minister - From the Ministry of Ecclesiastical Affairs.

Ecclesiastical Affairs
 
Denmark